John Nance Garner III (November 22, 1868 – November 7, 1967), known among his contemporaries as "Cactus Jack", was an American Democratic politician and lawyer from Texas. He served as the 32nd vice president of the United States under Franklin D. Roosevelt from 1933 to 1941 and as the 39th speaker of the United States House of Representatives from 1931 to 1933. He and Schuyler Colfax are the only politicians to have served as both speaker of the House and vice president of the United States.

Garner began his political career as the county judge of Uvalde County, Texas. He served in the Texas House of Representatives from 1898 to 1902 and won election to represent Texas in the United States House of Representatives in 1902. He represented Texas's 15th congressional district from 1903 to 1933. Garner served as House Minority Leader from 1929 to 1931, and was elevated to Speaker of the House when Democrats won control of the House following the 1930 elections.

Garner sought the Democratic presidential nomination in the 1932 presidential election, but agreed to serve as Franklin D. Roosevelt's running mate at the 1932 Democratic National Convention. He and Roosevelt won the 1932 election and were re-elected in 1936. A conservative Southerner, Garner opposed the sit-down strikes of the labor unions and the New Deal's deficit spending. However, Garner was also considered highly effective in the passage of New Deal legislation, with Roosevelt relying greatly on Garner's wealth of political friendships and legislative skills to pilot New Deal legislation through Congress. Unlike vice presidents before him, Garner also had a more active, non-ceremonial role in the U.S. Cabinet. He broke with Roosevelt in 1937 over a range of issues, especially the centralization of too much power in the federal government. Garner again sought the presidency in the 1940 presidential election, but Roosevelt won the party's presidential nomination at the 1940 Democratic National Convention, then chose Henry A. Wallace as his running mate.

Early life and family
Garner was born on November 22, 1868, in a log cabin in Red River County, Texas, to John Nance Garner Jr. and Sarah Guest Garner. That mud-chinked log cabin no longer exists, but the large, white, two-story house where he was raised survives and is located at 260 South Main Street in Detroit, Texas.

Garner attended Vanderbilt University in Nashville, Tennessee, for one semester before dropping out and returning home. He studied law at the firm of Sims and Wright in Clarksville, Texas, was admitted to the bar in 1890, and began practice in 1896 in Uvalde, Texas.

In 1893, Garner entered politics, running for county judge of Uvalde County, the county's chief administrative officer. Garner was opposed in the primary by a woman—Mariette "Ettie" Rheiner, a rancher's daughter, whom after the election, he courted and married in 1895. Garner won, and with the Democratic nomination seen as tantamount to election in the post-Civil War Solid South, Garner was elected county judge and served until 1896.

Texas politics
Garner was elected to the Texas House of Representatives in 1898, and re-elected in 1900. During his service, the legislature selected a state flower for Texas. Garner fervently supported the prickly pear cactus for the honor, and thus earned the nickname "Cactus Jack", although the bluebonnet was ultimately chosen.

He also drafted a resolution that would have divided Texas into five states, which passed the Texas House, but the bill was vetoed by the Governor.

In 1901 Garner voted for the poll tax, a measure passed by the Democratic-dominated legislature to make voter registration more difficult and reduce the number of black, minority, and poor white voters on the voting rolls. This disfranchised most minority voters until the 1960s, and ended challenges to Democratic power; Texas became in effect a one-party state.

Garner traveled parts of southern Texas controlled by the patrón system, currying political favor with the land bosses who exercised near-complete control of the local people and local elections. His patrón allies created a gerrymandered district for him, the 15th congressional district, a narrow strip reaching south to include tens of thousands of square miles of rural areas.

House of Representatives

Garner was first elected to the United States House of Representatives in 1902. He was elected from the district 14 subsequent times, serving until 1933. His wife was paid and worked as his private secretary during this period. Throughout his career he maintained allegiance to the white landowners who controlled the voting booths in South Texas. He regarded his Mexican voting base as "inferior and undesirable as U.S. citizens."

Garner was chosen to serve as minority floor leader for the Democrats in 1929, and in 1931 as Speaker of the United States House of Representatives, when the Democrats became the majority.

Garner supported passage of the federal income tax but opposed most tariffs except for those on wool and mohair, which were important to his Texas base. He also believed in rural investment, bringing taxpayer dollars to farmers of the Brush Country region of South Texas.

Garner was popular with his fellow House members in both parties. He held what he called his "board of education" during the era of Prohibition, a gathering spot for lawmakers to drink alcohol, or as Garner called it, "strike a blow for liberty." (The "board of education" was continued by future Speaker Sam Rayburn after Prohibition had ended and Garner had left the House.)

Vice presidency (1933–1941)
In 1932, Garner ran for the Democratic presidential nomination. It had become evident that Franklin D. Roosevelt, the Governor of New York, was the strongest of several candidates, but although he had a solid majority of convention delegates, he was 87.25 votes short of the two-thirds required for nomination. After Garner cut a deal with Roosevelt, thus allowing Roosevelt to win the nomination, Garner became his vice-presidential candidate.

Garner was re-elected to the 73rd Congress on November 8, 1932, and on the same day was elected Vice President of the United States. On February 8, 1933, then-Vice President Charles Curtis announced the election of his successor, House Speaker Garner, while Garner was seated next to him on the House dais. He was the second man, Schuyler Colfax being the first, to serve as both Speaker of the House and President of the Senate. Garner was re-elected Vice President with Roosevelt in 1936, serving in that office in total from March 4, 1933, to January 20, 1941.

Like most vice presidents in this era, Garner had little to do and little influence on the president's policies. He famously described the vice presidency as being "not worth a bucket of warm piss" (for many years, this quote was bowdlerized as "warm spit".) Historian Patrick Cox traces the possible origin of this quote to a 1960 conversation with Lyndon Johnson, who consulted Garner on John Kennedy's offer to run for vice president.

During Roosevelt's second term, Garner's previously warm relationship with the president quickly soured, as Garner disagreed sharply with him on a wide range of important issues. Garner supported federal intervention to break up the Flint sit-down strike, supported a balanced federal budget, opposed the Judiciary Reorganization Bill of 1937 to "pack" the Supreme Court with additional judges, and opposed executive interference with the internal business of the Congress.

During 1938 and 1939, numerous Democratic party leaders urged Garner to run for president in the 1940 presidential election. Garner identified as the champion of the traditional Democratic Party establishment, which often clashed with supporters of Roosevelt's New Deal. The Gallup poll showed that Garner was the favorite among Democratic voters, based on the assumption that Roosevelt would defer to the longstanding two-term tradition and not run for a third term. Time characterized him on April 15, 1940:

Some other Democrats did not find him appealing. In congressional testimony, union leader John L. Lewis described him using tetrameter as "a labor-baiting, poker-playing, whiskey-drinking, evil old man".Garner declared his candidacy. Roosevelt refused to say whether he would run again. If he did, it was highly unlikely that Garner could win the nomination, but Garner stayed in the race anyway. He opposed some of Roosevelt's New Deal policies, most notably those related to wooing labor, and on principle, opposed presidents serving third terms. However, Garner was also credited with steering a number of important bills through Congress in the crisis atmosphere of Roosevelt's first one hundred days in office and his relationship with the President would not become strained until Roosevelt's second term, when the Vice President's hopes of balancing the budget and paring New Deal programs faded. He was also active in Roosevelt's Cabinet meetings on national policy and legislative strategy, which also resulted in the effective transformation of the previously ceremonial office of the U.S. Vice President. However, the president's "court-packing" plan of 1937 widened the rift with Garner, and the final blow in their relationship came when the president attempted to purge opposition Democratic members of Congress in the 1938 elections.

At the Democratic National Convention, Roosevelt engineered a "spontaneous" call for his renomination, and won on the first ballot. Garner received only 61 votes out of 1,093. Roosevelt chose Henry A. Wallace to be his vice-presidential running mate.

Post vice-presidency (1941–1967) 
Garner left office on January 20, 1941, ending a 46-year career in public life. He retired to his home in Uvalde for the last 26 years of his life, where he managed his extensive real estate holdings, spent time with his great-grandchildren, and fished. Throughout his retirement, he was consulted by active Democratic politicians and was especially close to Roosevelt's successor, Harry S. Truman.

On the morning of Garner's 95th birthday, November 22, 1963, President John F. Kennedy called to wish him a happy birthday. This was several hours before Kennedy's assassination. Dan Rather states that he visited the Garner ranch that morning to film an interview with Garner, where Miss Texas Wool was in attendance, and that he then flew back to Dallas from Uvalde to deposit the film at then-CBS affiliate KRLD-TV (now Fox owned-and-operated KDFW-TV).

Personal life and death

Garner and Mariette Rheiner met and began dating after the primary election in 1893. They married in Sabinal, Texas, on November 25, 1895. Mariette served as her husband's secretary throughout his congressional career, and as Second Lady of the United States during her husband's tenure as vice president. Their son, Tully Charles Garner (1896–1968), became a banker and businessman. Garner died of a coronary occlusion on November 7, 1967, 15 days before his 99th birthday. Garner remains the longest-lived Vice President of the United States in history.

Legacy

The women's dormitory at Southwest Texas Junior College in Uvalde bears his wife's name. John Garner Middle School, located in San Antonio's North East Independent School District, is also named after him.

Garner and Schuyler Colfax, vice president under Ulysses S. Grant, are the only two vice presidents to have been Speaker of the House of Representatives prior to becoming vice president. As the vice president is also the President of the Senate, Garner and Colfax are the only people to have served as the presiding officer of both houses of Congress.

See also
 Conservative Democrat

Footnotes

Further reading 
 Anders, Evan. "The Election of John Nance Garner to Congress" in Anders, Boss Rule in South Texas. Austin, TX: University of Texas Press, 1982. online
 
 Champagne, Anthony. "John Nance Garner", in Raymond W Smock and Susan W Hammond, eds. Masters of the House: Congressional Leadership Over Two Centuries (1998) pp 144–80.
 Cooper, George. "Texas, Banks, and John Nance Garner." East Texas Historical Journal 56.1 (2018): 7+ online.
 Cox, Patrick. "John Nance Garner" in Kenneth E. Hendrickson, Jr., ed. Profiles in Power: Twentieth-Century Texans in Washington (2nd ed. 2004)
 
 Patenaude, Lionel V. "The Garner Vote Switch to Roosevelt: 1932 Democratic Convention." Southwestern Historical Quarterly 79.2 (1975): 189-204. 
 Patenaude, Lionel V. "Garner, Sumners, and Connally: The Defeat of the Roosevelt Court Bill in 1937." Southwestern Historical Quarterly 74.1 (1970): 36-51. 
 
 
 Timmons, Bascom N. Garner of Texas: A Personal History. 1948. online
 Will, George. "In Cactus Jack's Footsteps". Jewish World Review Jan 6, 2000.

External links 

 
 Let's get goin'!, Bill Sykes Editorial Cartoon depicting Garner's 1940 presidential candidacy, December 19, 1939
 Conspicuous among the casualties, Bill Sykes Editorial Cartoon depicting Vandenberg and Garner in 1940 presidential primaries, April 4, 1940

|-

|-

|-

|-

|-

1868 births
1967 deaths
20th-century vice presidents of the United States
1932 United States vice-presidential candidates
1936 United States vice-presidential candidates
Methodists from Texas
Burials in Texas
Candidates in the 1932 United States presidential election
Candidates in the 1940 United States presidential election
County judges in Texas
Democratic Party (United States) vice presidential nominees
Democratic Party vice presidents of the United States
Democratic Party members of the United States House of Representatives from Texas
Democratic Party members of the Texas House of Representatives
Minority leaders of the United States House of Representatives
People from Red River County, Texas
People from Uvalde, Texas
Protestants from Texas
Speakers of the United States House of Representatives
Texas lawyers
Vice presidents of the United States